Mark Shail (born 15 October 1966) is a former footballer who played in The Football League for Bristol City and Kidderminster Harriers.

Career
Shail started his career at Winnipeg Fury then moved to Worcester City before he earned a transfer to Yeovil Town and then on to Bristol City where he became first team Captain. He joined Kidderminster Harriers in 2000 before ending his career with his first club Worcester. Since retiring from football he has worked as a journalist for the Professional Footballers' Association.

References

English footballers
Bristol City F.C. players
Kidderminster Harriers F.C. players
Yeovil Town F.C. players
Worcester City F.C. players
English Football League players
1981 births
Living people
Association football defenders
Winnipeg Fury players